Bangabandhu Sheikh Mujib Safari Park is a safari park in Gazipur, Bangladesh. This safari park is spread over 3810 acres (1542 ha) of Sal Forest which makes it one of the largest safari parks in the world and the largest in Asia. It was inaugurated on October 31, 2013. It is located about 40 km north of Bangladesh's capital city Dhaka near the Dhaka - Mymensingh Highway.

The park is divided into 6 major sections: Core Safari, Safari Kingdom, Biodiversity Park, Extensive Asian Safari Park, Bangabandhu Square & Children's Park.

Animals
This safari park is home to 47 species of animals and birds out of which 28 species are local. The total population of animals and birds is about 3000. Most notable are :
 Tiger
 Lion
Elephant
 Zebra
 Deer
 Swan
 Butterfly
 Duck
 Snake
 Bear
 Peafowl
 Nilgai
 Hippopotamus
 Alligator
 Kangaroo
 Gharial

Core Safari
Only authorised buses can enter into this zone. But visitors can see the animals in natural environment while sitting inside the bus. This zone is made up with 1335 acres of land in which 20 acres of land for tiger, 21 acres of land for lion, 8.50 acres of land for black bear, 8 acres of land for African cheetah, 81.50 acres of land for chital, 80 acres of land for gaur, 105 acres of land for elephant, 35 acres of land for hippo, 22 acres of land for deer, 25 acres of land for nilgai, 407 acres of land for buffalo and 290 acres of land for African safari.

Reception 
The Daily Star called the Safari Park "one of the best latest tourist additions". The park attracts regular visitors from Dhaka.

References

Safari parks
Parks in Bangladesh
2013 establishments in Bangladesh
Memorials to Sheikh Mujibur Rahman